is the Japanese word for princess or a lady of higher birth. Daughters of a monarch are actually referred to by other terms, e.g. , literally king's daughter, even though Hime can be used to address Ōjo. 

The word Hime initially referred to any beautiful female person. The antonym of Hime is Shikome (醜女), literally ugly female, though it is archaic and rarely used. Hime may also indicate feminine or simply small when used together with other words, such as Hime-gaki (a low line of hedge). 

Hime is commonly seen as part of a Japanese female divinity's name, such as Toyotama-hime. The Kanji applied to transliterate Hime are 比売 or 毘売 rather than 姫. The masculine counterpart of Hime is Hiko (彦, 比古 or 毘古,) which is seen as part of Japanese male gods' names, such as Saruta-hiko. Unlike Hime, Hiko is neutral, non-archaic and still commonly used as a modern Japanese male given name, for example Nobuhiko Takada.

Proverb
Ichi hime ni taro "First baby, a girl. Second baby, a boy": It originally meant that having a girl first, and a boy second was easier on the mother as she gained experience before nurturing a boy. However, with each household having fewer children, this is commonly confused as having "one girl and two boys", or three children. This is because "ichi" means "one" in Japanese and "ni" means "two" in Japanese, and therefore could be read as, "One girl, two boys."

Usage
While many use the name Hime to address those of a higher or more noble birth, there are a few who use it as a girl's name. Thus some names either incorporate the word Hime or the giver simply will name said girl Hime.

Historical
 Himiko Some believe that Himiko is a transliteration from Japanese to Chinese of Himemiko or female shaman.
 Soga no Kitashihime (consort of Emperor Kimmei)

Sengoku Period
 Nōhime (wife of Oda Nobunaga)
 Ichi Hime (市姫)　(younger sister of Oda Nobunaga)
 Koma Hime (駒姫) (daughter of Mogami Yoshiaki)
 Gotoku Hime (五徳姫) (daughter of Oda Nobunaga)
 Iroha Hime (五郎八姫)  (daughter of Date Masamune)
 Toku Hime （督姫） (second daughter of Tokugawa Ieyasu)
 Hosokawa Gracia (daughter of Akechi Mitsuhide)
 Senhime (Princess Sen, eldest daughter Shogun Tokugawa Hidetada)
 Komatsuhime (daughter of Honda Tadakatsu)
 Yodo-dono (daughter of Ichi Hime (市姫))
 Hatsu Hime (初姫)　(daughter of Ichi Hime (市姫))
 Oeyo (daughter of Ichi Hime (市姫), wife of Tokugawa Hidetada)
 Tachibana Ginchiyo　(daughter of Tachibana Dōsetsu)
 Mah Hime (摩阿姫) (daughter of Maeda Toshiie)
 Go hime (豪姫) (daughter of Maeda Toshiie)

Literature
 Kaguya-hime; or The Moon Princess; The Tale of the Bamboo Cutter folk tale
 Tsubaki-hime (椿姫, a common Japanese translation of the French work The Lady of the Camellias)

In popular culture
 Shikabane Hime  is a Japanese manga series and a TV anime series
 Anmitsu Hime (The Sugar Princess, anime and manga series)
 Mononoke Hime (Princess Mononoke, film)
 Hime, the lead character in the anime and manga series Princess Resurrection.
 Sakura Hime Kaden, a manga by Arina Tanemura
 Fushigiboshi no Futagohime, a Japanese anime
 Tsunade Hime, a character from the manga Naruto
 Orihime Inoue, a character from the Manga & Anime Bleach.
 Yashahime: Princess Half-Demon, the sequel to the manga and anime series Inuyasha.
 Utahime Iori, a supporting character in the Manga and Anime  Jujutsu Kaisen.
 Luna Himemori, a Hololive VTuber

Castle
 Himeji Castle

See also
 Tenno

Japanese nobility
Japanese words and phrases